The Dadra and Nagar Haveli and Daman and Diu football team is an Indian football team representing the union territory of Dadra and Nagar Haveli and Daman and Diu in Indian state football competitions including the Santosh Trophy. The Dadra and Nagar Haveli and Daman and Diu football teams participated in the national competitions until they were merged in the 2022–23 Indian football season and made its senior national debut in the 2022–23 Santosh Trophy edition.

Team 
The following 22 players were called up prior to the 2022–23 Santosh Trophy.

References

Santosh Trophy teams
Football in Dadra and Nagar Haveli and Daman and Diu